Henry Casimir I of Nassau-Dietz (21 January 1612 – 13 July 1640) was count of Nassau-Dietz and Stadtholder of Friesland, Groningen and Drenthe.

Life 
He was born in Arnhem, the eldest son of Ernst Casimir of Nassau-Dietz and Sophia Hedwig of Brunswick-Lüneburg, and, like his father, died in battle.

Henry Casimir was christened at Arnhem. The English representative, Sophia Hedwig being the niece of the queen Anne of Denmark, was Sir Edward Cecil. He brought gifts of a cupboard of gilt plate, a diamond necklace with a locket, horses, and an embroidered petticoat for Sophia Hedwig.

He became count of Nassau-Dietz and stadtholder of Friesland, Groningen and Drenthe upon the death of his father, Count Ernst Casimir of Nassau-Dietz, at the Siege of Roermond in June 1632. A week later, he was already involved in the Capture of Maastricht, along with his cousin, Frederick Henry, Prince of Orange.

On 12 July 1640, he was wounded in Sint Jansteen at the battle of Hulst. He died the next day. Hendrik Casimir is buried in Leeuwarden, and was succeeded in his titles by William Frederick, Prince of Nassau-Dietz. His death at Hulst, aged 28, caused a series of memorials to his name and the battle in which he died. The Rijksmuseum keeps a blood-stained shirt in the collection supposedly worn by him when he was wounded. Similarly, the bullet hole in his father's hat is also kept there for posterity.

Ancestors

References

External links
 Blood-stained shirt in collection Rijksmuseum of Amsterdam
 https://web.archive.org/web/20070927215051/http://www.iec.nhl.nl/socvak/grotekerk/prinsenstallen/hencas.htm
 https://web.archive.org/web/20090301235747/http://www.dodenakkers.nl/artikelen/oranje-nassau/grafkelderleeuwarden.html

1612 births
1640 deaths
Dutch stadtholders
People from Arnhem